Harry Elzendoorn (17 March 1929 – 2008) is a Belgian rower. He competed in the men's coxless four event at the 1952 Summer Olympics.

References

1929 births
2008 deaths
Belgian male rowers
Olympic rowers of Belgium
Rowers at the 1952 Summer Olympics
Sportspeople from Antwerp